The following is a list of presidents, rectors, and noted alumni and professors of Ben-Gurion University of the Negev in Be'er Sheva, Israel.

Presidents 
 Prof. Moshe Prywes 1973–1975
 Ambassador Yosef Tekoah 1975–1981
 Maj–Gen (Res.) Shlomo Gazit 1982–1985
 Prof. Chaim Elata 1985–1990
 MK Prof. Avishay Braverman 1990–2006
 Prof. Rivka Carmi 2006–2018
 Prof. Daniel Chamovitz 2019-

Rectors 
 Prof. Haim Hanani 1970–1973
 Prof. Zvi Pelah 1973–1974
 Prof. Moshe Rozen 1974–1979
 Prof. David Wolf 1979–1984
 Prof. Chaim Elata 1984–1986
 Prof. Avraham Tamir 1986–1990
 Prof. Dov Bahat 1990–1994
 Prof. Nahum Finger 1994–2002
 Prof. Jimmy Winblatt 2002–2010
 Prof. Zvi HaCohen 2010–2018
 Prof. Chaim Hames 2018-

Notable faculty

Aaron Antonovsky, sociologist
Aharon Appelfeld, author
Haim Be'er, author
Jacob Bekenstein, theoretical physicist 
Ilana Krausman Ben-Amos, historian 
Gerald Blidstein, Jewish Philosophy – Israel Prize Recipient  
Dan Blumberg, geographer
Rivka Carmi, pediatrician
Daniel Chamovitz, plant biologist
Miriam Cohen, mathematician
Shlomi Dolev, computer scientist
David Faiman, solar engineer
Yisrael Friedman, historian
Tikva Frymer-Kensky, biblical scholar
Neve Gordon, political scientist
Chaim Hames, Historian
Yitzhak Hen, historian
Samuel Hollander, economist
Klara Kedem, computer scientist
Etgar Keret, author
Howard Kreisel, philosopher
Shaul Ladany, industrial engineering
Michael Lin, mathematician
Dan Meyerstein, chemist and president of Ariel University
Benny Morris, historian
David Newman, political geographer
Amos Oz, author
Renee Poznanski, political scientist and historian of the Holocaust in France
Joshua Prawer, historian
Elisha Qimron, Hebrew scholar
Eliahu Stern, geographer
Aviad Raz, sociologist
Danny Rubinstein, journalist
Michael Segal, algorithmic networking
Alice Shalvi, educator
Richard Shusterman, philosopher
Daniel Sivan, Hebrew literature professor
Carsten Peter Thiede, biblical scholar
Jacob Turkel, Israeli supreme court justice
Oren Yiftachel, geographer
Avishai Henik, psychologist
Moti Herskowitz, chemical engineering
Golan Shahar, clinical psychologist
Ohad Birk, physician scientist 
Steven A Rosen, archaeologist 
Vered Slonim-Nevo, social work 
Yuval Golan, materials scientist 
Jiwchar Ganor, environmental scientist
Joseph Kost, biomedical scientist
Zvi HaCohen, organic chemistry
Oded Lowengart, marketing 
Limor Aharonson-Daniel, injury epidemiology  
Yuval Elovici, computer and network security
Amit Schejter, communication studies
 Ozer Schild (1930-2006), Danish-born Israeli academic, President of the University of Haifa and President of the College of Judea and Samaria ("Ariel College").
Yuval Shahar, artificial intelligence and medical informatics
Noam Weisbrod, hydrology
Nirit Ben-Aryeh Debby, art history
Abraham Zangen, neuroscience
Yigal Meir, Physicist
Harold J. Vinegar, geology

Notable alumni 

 Muhammad Al-Nabari
 Orna Barbivai
 Isaac Berzin (born 1967), chemical engineer
 Gilad Bracha
Alon Chen (born 1970), neuroscientist; 11th President of the Weizmann Institute of Science
 Amira Dotan (born 1947), member of Knesset
 Shai Efrati (born 1971), physician and director of research center
 Varda Shalev, researcher and family physician
 Gila Gamliel (born 1974), member of Knesset
 Anastasia Gloushkov (born 1985), Olympic synchronized swimmer
 Arieh Iserles (born 1947), mathematician 
 Ofer Lahav (born 1959)
 Hadas Malada-Matzri, M.D. (born 1984), first Ethiopian Israeli female doctor in the Israel Defense Forces
 Silvan Shalom (born 1958), Israeli minister
 Eliezer Shkedi (born 1957), CEO of El Al
 Yaakov Turner
 Mordechai Vanunu
 Shelly Yachimovich (born 1960), member of the Knesset, former leader of the Israeli Labor Party
 Michael W. Sonnenfeldt (born 1955)
 Tamar Zandberg (born 1976) member of Knesset

References

Ben-Gurion University of the Negev alumni
Academic staff of Ben-Gurion University of the Negev
Ben-Gurion University of the Negev